A reed level is an Arabic invention for determining level for the purpose of construction. A hole is put through a long straight reed and water is poured into the center. When the flow out of both sides is equal, the reed is level. The device serves the same purpose as a spirit level.

References

Inclinometers